Vans Corner is an unincorporated community in Bonner County, Idaho, United States.

References

Unincorporated communities in Bonner County, Idaho
Unincorporated communities in Idaho